Qızıldaş (also, Gyzyldash and Gyzyl-Tepe) is a settlement and municipality in Baku, Azerbaijan.  It has a population of 3,869.  The municipality consists of the settlements of Gyzyldash and Shongar.

References 

Populated places in Baku